The third season of the American television series Agents of S.H.I.E.L.D., based on the Marvel Comics organization S.H.I.E.L.D., follows Phil Coulson and his team of S.H.I.E.L.D. agents and Inhumans as they face new threats to the world. It is set in the Marvel Cinematic Universe (MCU) and acknowledges the continuity of the franchise's films. The season was produced by ABC Studios, Marvel Television, and Mutant Enemy Productions, with Jed Whedon, Maurissa Tancharoen, and Jeffrey Bell serving as showrunners.

Clark Gregg reprises his role as Coulson from the film series, starring alongside the returning series regulars Ming-Na Wen, Brett Dalton, Chloe Bennet, Iain De Caestecker, Elizabeth Henstridge, Nick Blood, Adrianne Palicki. They are joined by Henry Simmons and Luke Mitchell who were promoted from recurring guest roles in the second season. The third season was ordered in May 2015, and filmed from that July to the following April. It takes inspiration from the Secret Warriors comic, combining it with the series' Inhuman and Hydra storylines, while paralleling the film Captain America: Civil War (2016); connections to other MCU television series are also included in the season, as are characters from previous MCU media. Glenn Hetrick created prosthetics for the less-human looking Inhumans, Legacy Effects provided additional practical effects, and FuseFX returned to create the visual effects.

The first episode of the season premiered in Los Angeles on September 23, 2015, with the season, consisting of 22 episodes, airing on ABC from September 29, 2015, until May 17, 2016. The premiere was watched by 4.90 million viewers, higher than any episode of the entire second half of season two. Overall, the season had generally consistent ratings, and received positive reviews. Critics felt the series had 'hit its stride' with the season, and particularly praised the risky bottle episode "4,722 Hours", though the pacing of the season received criticism for trying to do too much at times. The series was renewed for a fourth season in March 2016.

Episodes

Cast and characters

Main
 Clark Gregg as Phil Coulson
 Ming-Na Wen as Melinda May
 Brett Dalton as Grant Ward and Hive
 Chloe Bennet as Daisy Johnson / Quake
 Iain De Caestecker as Leo Fitz
 Elizabeth Henstridge as Jemma Simmons
 Nick Blood as Lance Hunter
 Adrianne Palicki as Bobbi Morse
 Henry Simmons as Alphonso "Mack" Mackenzie
 Luke Mitchell as Lincoln Campbell

Recurring
 Constance Zimmer as Rosalind Price
 Andrew Howard as Luther Banks
 Juan Pablo Raba as Joey Gutierrez
 Spencer Treat Clark as Werner von Strucker
 Blair Underwood as Andrew Garner
 Matthew Willig as Lash
 Powers Boothe as Gideon Malick
 Mark Dacascos as Giyera
 Natalia Cordova-Buckley as Elena "Yo-Yo" Rodriguez
 Adrian Pasdar as Glenn Talbot
 Axle Whitehead as J.T. James / Hellfire
 John Hannah as Holden Radcliffe

Notable guests
 William Sadler as Matthew Ellis
 Peter MacNicol as Elliot Randolph
 Tyler Ritter as Thomas Ward
 Brian Patrick Wade as Carl Creel
 Titus Welliver as Felix Blake
 Reed Diamond as Daniel Whitehall
 Derek Phillips as O'Brien

Production

Development
In March 2014, executive producer Jeffrey Bell stated at the Agents of S.H.I.E.L.D. PaleyFest panel that the producers and the writers are able to read the screenplays for upcoming Marvel Cinematic Universe films to know where the universe is heading, which allowed them to form a general plan for the show through the end of a third season. The series was renewed for that third season on May 7, 2015. By April 2015, Marvel had been developing a spinoff series to accompany the season, starring Adrianne Palicki and Nick Blood, but ABC opted not to go ahead with it, with entertainment president Paul Lee saying, "We thought the right thing now is to leave [Palicki and Blood] on S.H.I.E.L.D., because S.H.I.E.L.D. is so strong  the moment".

However, a pilot for the spinoff was ordered in August 2015, with the series titled Marvel's Most Wanted. Bell and fellow Agents of S.H.I.E.L.D. executive producer Paul Zbyszewski developed the series, while working on Hunter and Morse's storyline for season three, preparing them to move over to the spin-off. Bell explained that it would set up Marvel's Most Wanted by defining exactly who the characters are, such as Hunter and his lack of loyalty to S.H.I.E.L.D. and to ideologies—"nothing specific about the show, it's just who Hunter is"—and that while the characters are "on S.H.I.E.L.D., we want to take advantage of who they are, and give the audience as much of their relationship with one another, and with other people, as possible. We are aware that there is a potential imminent end, and so they won't be neglected."

Hunter and Morse are written off the series in the episode "Parting Shot", both leaving S.H.I.E.L.D., as Palicki and Blood "physically had to go leave to shoot the pilot ... they had to stop being on S.H.I.E.L.D. and get ready for the pilot and then shoot the pilot and all of that, so it didn't make sense for us to have all these episodes with them and then not have them in two or three episodes, and then go, "Oh, we were just over here," and then come back and go away again." On whether they could return to the series at some point, Bell said, "I can't answer that, but I can say it would be kind of cheating to make Mack cry like that only to buy it back—not that we haven't brought characters back from the dead. We want to earn stuff."

Writing

In May 2015, Bell said that writing for the third season would begin the following month, with the story set six months after the events that concluded the second season. Bell stated that S.H.I.E.L.D. would be depicted as it was in the second season, underground with small "pockets" of S.H.I.E.L.D. around the world, as following the release of Captain America: The Winter Soldier "we found we like our team ... as underdogs, as opposed to a giant, powerful, NSA organization that can do pretty much anything."

Regarding the characters that could appear in the season, Bell said in May 2015 that "The idea of some familiar faces with some new faces is something to look forward to. I also think finding some new Marvel characters to pull into the universe would be cool. Fans seem to respond when there are characters from the Marvel comics and Marvel Cinematic Universe." He later explained that the series has the opportunity to explore the Inhumans outside of the Royal Family (who are the major focus of the comics, television series and previously planned film). The season mentions the character Eden Fesi as an Inhuman, who is a mutant in the comics. The change was due to 20th Century Fox controlling the film and television rights to the majority of Marvel's X-Men and mutant characters.

When asked about possible hints made in the season two finale towards an adaptation of Secret Warriors, Bell noted that the series does share the character Daisy Johnson with that comic, and "the idea of a team of powered people is something we've seen in the show ... I think there's a world down the road where we do our version." Elaborating on this and the series dealing with the many powered people introduced in season two, Bell said, "People seem to respond to powered people on the show and while it's not going to take over and become what the show's about, as a texture and flavor of the stories, we really enjoy that. The fact that Inhumans are now out there is something I think we need to investigate". He later clarified that characters would not have to be Inhuman to join the Secret Warriors, just powered, and that not just any powered character would be allowed to join, given that Daisy had to go through years of training on top of getting powers to join the team, and so similar rules would apply to other potential members. Executive producers Maurissa Tancharoen and Jed Whedon also discussed the Secret Warriors, the former cautioning "a very slow build" to the team, and the latter explaining, "We feel a duty to the Cinematic Universe to not hyper-accelerate how many people have powers ... We don't want it to be there's a thousand people with powers with a show that at its heart is about what it's like to not have powers in a world with powers."

In September 2015, Tancharoen stated the overall theme for the season explored with each character was them "trying to get back in touch with their humanity in a world where Inhumans are popping up," with Whedon adding that the nature of couples–some having broken up in previous episodes, some getting back together, and potential for new ones–would be explored. Later that month, Bell talked about some of the new character pairings in the season, saying "Putting Mack and Daisy together; putting Hunter and May together; putting Bobbi and Fitz together—suddenly you have all these different dynamics, all these different stories that you didn't have before." Tancharoen later highlighted the number of characters in the season compared to previous, stating that "There's more scale and scope, but at the same time, I think we're diving into each character's internal struggle a little bit more."

The second part of the season, which begins with episode 11, takes place three months after the events of episode 10. On the structure of the season and shifting the focus between the two parts, Bell stated it was the intent to follow the format from season two, by tying "a whole bunch of [interesting threads] but not all of them off by the midseason. And then we launch something exciting for the back half...the promise of more to come." Whedon added that "though we do break the season up, we feel that the season as a whole is one arc" and so the series would explore the same themes in the second half, "themes of what it means to be human and Inhuman. What does it mean to all these people when they have to live with their actions? Are they capable of the things their enemies are capable of?...What is the true nature of a person? Is everybody capable of everything if put in a terrible position? Or is there true good and a true evil?" The second half of the season sees the introduction of the comics' right-wing hate group the Watchdogs, depicted as radicals wishing to "eliminate the Inhumans", as well as a "cure" that can prevent terrigenisis in yet-to-transition Inhumans.

"Bouncing Back" opens with "a mysterious flash-forward to three months in the future, showing an unidentified S.H.I.E.L.D. agent seemingly dead in space." Tancharoen called it "the promise of something fairly ominous to come", and stated, "We will be uncovering things from the midseason opener all the way to the finale. We will slowly be discovering what that image is." She added that any "clues" would likely play out during present day sequences rather than further flash-forwards, such as when Daisy receives a vision of the flash-forward in "Spacetime", an episode where she learns that "she cannot change the outcome of these visions and the future is the future." Whedon discussed this idea, and that of the "theory behind the Inhumans that each one of them serves a purpose", saying, Inhumans "are made, they're not random. There's a lack of something that needs filling and an Inhuman will be created that fills that niche. It's an interesting concept we like playing with, and that plays into the idea of fate, which with our future visions, we're hitting pretty hard." On choosing Lincoln to be the one to die, which the executive producers knew going into the season when forming the arcs for Lincoln, Daisy, and Ward, Bell said he "earned it" adding that Lincoln comes to a point where he realizes what his purpose is, with Whedon noting that he understands that Daisy has a different purpose. Whedon continued that the decision was based on the fact that the series did not "want to be a body count show, but it is a real world with real stakes. What we had not done is the heroic death and the full-sacrifice death. This was a conscious decision. We also think that there’s a poetry in the fact that the person doing it doesn’t consider himself a hero. That’s the beauty of the moment—it’s not just for [Daisy], but it is, and it’s not just for him, but it is."

Discussing the season finale, Tancharoen stated, "This season, we've explored a lot of different themes: There's the notion of purpose. We also introduced an Inhuman who has a strong sense of faith. We talk a lot about destiny and all these things intertwine." Bennet likened the end of the season to "the end of the first book of S.H.I.E.L.D. This finale feels like the end of something bigger and the beginning of a whole new tone for the show." Whedon added, "We wanted to put a close to [Hive's] story. We knew going into this season what our plan was for both Ward and Hive. Our goal was to make it not just feel like victory—we like to get a victory and also a loss at the same time." On whether the Inhumans storyline would also be ending with the season, Whedon said, "We think of it as never closed. We like that we were able to open up that world and make Inhumans a permanent part of the universe. Now, we have a quick-fire way of introducing people with powers. It gives us a lot of leeway in our world, and it lets us explode the metaphors of what it is like to be different. We will never close that chapter." On making a six-month time jump at the end of "Ascension", Bell said that despite each character completing their arcs this season, "we still have a lot of plot. Emotionally, their arcs are done. What the jump lets you do is to do a reset ... It allows us to put down a lot of old plot and pick up a lot of new." Whedon added, "We’ve done it each season, so we just wanted to do it a little early ... we would’ve done [the time jump] in episode 1 next year but what we wanted to do was tease" things to come at the end of this season.

Casting
All principal cast members from the first and second seasons (Clark Gregg as Phil Coulson, Ming-Na Wen as Melinda May, Brett Dalton as Grant Ward, Chloe Bennet as Daisy Johnson (no longer going by the name of "Skye"), Iain De Caestecker as Leo Fitz, Elizabeth Henstridge as Jemma Simmons, Nick Blood as Lance Hunter, and Adrianne Palicki as Bobbi Morse) return for the third season. In May 2015, Bell said that the writers would look to incorporate the character Lincoln Campbell into the season, as he was a "nice addition" to the second season, and that they were looking forward to exploring Alphonso "Mack" Mackenzie's character in new ways during the third season following his role in the second-season finale. Luke Mitchell and Henry Simmons, who recurred as Lincoln and Mack, respectively, throughout the second season, were subsequently promoted to the principal cast for the third. During the season, Grant Ward is killed. His body is possessed by the parasitic Inhuman Hive, based on a creature from the Secret Warriors comic, with Dalton taking on that role. Also returning from earlier in the series are Daz Crawford as Kebo, Peter MacNicol as Elliot Randolph, Blair Underwood as Andrew Garner, Alicia Vela-Bailey as Alisha Whitley, Brian Patrick Wade as Carl Creel, Adrian Pasdar as Glenn Talbot, Raquel Gardner as Carla Talbot, Titus Welliver as Felix Blake, Reed Diamond as Daniel Whitehall, and Derek Phillips as O'Brien.

In July 2015, the Inhuman Lash, a villainous character from the comics, was confirmed to be appearing in the season, while Andrew Howard and Constance Zimmer were cast as Luther Banks and Rosalind Price, respectively, both recurring. In August 2015, Matthew Willig was revealed to be cast as Lash, while Juan Pablo Raba was announced as another new Inhuman, Joey Gutierrez. In October, Powers Boothe was announced in the recurring role of Gideon Malick, the previously unnamed World Security Council member that he portrayed in The Avengers. The next month, Lash was revealed to be the Inhuman form of Andrew Garner, and Mark Dacascos was announced in the "heavily recurring" role of Giyera. Tyler Ritter appeared as Grant Ward's younger brother Thomas in December 2015. The character previously appeared as a boy through flashbacks in "The Well". By February 2016, Natalia Cordova-Buckley was cast as Elena "Yo-Yo" Rodriguez, a Secret Warrior from the comics. Axle Whitehead and John Hannah also recur as the Inhuman J.T. James / Hellfire and scientist Holden Radcliffe, respectively. Additionally, Alexander Wraith makes multiple appearances as the minor S.H.I.E.L.D. agent Anderson, while William Sadler reprises his role of President Matthew Ellis from Iron Man 3.

Design
The season introduces a new title graphic for the series, replacing the one that appeared for the first two seasons, as well as a new aircraft for the team called Zephyr One, designed by series visual effects vendor FuseFX. Glenn Hetrick again worked with the make-up and visual effects departments to design and create the more "unique"-looking Inhumans, such as Lash, after having worked on Raina during season two. Willig's Lash make-up initially took 6 hours to apply, but the make-up team was able to reduce the time to 4.5 hours. Before a new Inhuman character can be introduced, the cost of creating their powers must be weighed, with Bell saying, "Can we afford to produce this effect? Because every time last year Gordon [teleported] we went, 'Wow, that was [expensive].'" For the S.H.I.E.L.D. agents' costumes, series costume designer Ann Foley made sure to reflect the fact that they have "graduated from the ragtag group of soldiers and scientists to the more precise militaristic outfit they always imagined they were." As well, once Simmons returns from Maveth, her costumes did not feature any color, patterns, or prints, in order to reflect Simmons' emotional space.

Bennet cut her hair for the season, in order to further her character's transformation to the Daisy Johnson / Quake of the comics, while not cutting her hair as short as her comic counterpart. Bennet stated, "The comic book version of Daisy Johnson has very short, Miley Cyrus-esque hair. We wanted to stay true to the comic book character fans love; I wanted to please them but also make sure there was still some movement and length and sexiness in the hair." Bennet also received a new costume for the season, along with Quake's signature gauntlets. On the costume, Foley said, "It's about strength. She feels very empowered in it....I wanted to stay true to some of the designs I saw in the comics. In the style lines, I wanted to pay a little bit of a tribute to [Daisy's] tactical ability from last season, but we also incorporated the Quake symbol into her gauntlets and on the back of her suit." Legacy Effects created the gauntlets and utility belt, "out of flexible materials painted to look like metal" so as not to injure anyone during stunts.

After losing a hand at the end of the second season, Coulson receives a prosthetic replacement with "a few surprises hidden inside". Prop master Scott Bauer took a mold of Gregg's hand to build the prosthetic and was able to make the fingers bendable to depict Coulson holding objects. The hand evolves throughout the season, with a later iteration projecting an energy shield, inspired by a similar one used in the comics by Captain America. The energy shield was created by Cosa, one of the series' visual effects vendors.

Filming
Production on the season began in late July 2015, in Culver City, California, and lasted until late April 2016. Location filming for the alien planet occurred in a work quarry in Simi Valley and in Northridge, Los Angeles near the Mojave Desert.

Music
With the season reinventing the series again, composer Bear McCreary expanded the sound of the score "in a big way". In addition to introducing new themes for the characters of Lash and Rosalind Price, McCreary made some changes to the orchestra: "To represent Lash, I brought in larger percussion: merciless pounding taikos that I digitally compressed and distorted. This new, mangled percussion sound is horrific, and will become increasingly important as the season progresses." McCreary also brought in trombones "to get the scariest sound possible," which resulted in the recording space being reconfigured when they were recorded. For Price, her scenes with Coulson "give the series the feeling of a dense political thriller...I really leaned into that, musically. I introduce light acoustic percussion, mostly egg shakers, to give the pulsing synths a softer edge. And I used an acoustic piano to play the "Rosalind Theme" at key moments in her scenes...her music is meant to add intrigue and suspicion, and simultaneously allow us to have some fun with their witty banter." For "Maveth", McCreary used a 90-piece orchestra rather than the series' typical 50 or 70 players.

Marvel Cinematic Universe tie-ins
On the season's potential for crossover with the rest of the MCU, Bell said in May 2015 that "I think [last] year worked really well—we got to be our own show and tell our own stories in the Marvel Cinematic Universe and do a nice hand off or a tie-in, but neither are incumbent upon the other to be a follow, and I think that's a great model for us. Ant-Man comes out this summer and will have come and gone before we air again in September, so whether there's anything vestigial from that or for [Captain America: Civil War] next season is to be determined. But we're in contact with the movie people and them with us, and any time we can put little easter eggs in, it's a lot of fun for die-hard fans." Bell also stated that there was a possibility of Hayley Atwell once again reprising her role as Peggy Carter in the season for an Agent Carter crossover, and after the series acknowledged the character's death in Civil War, added, "Any time we can make a connection to her, whether in a flashback or dealing with what’s happening now, it makes the universe smaller."

In June 2015, it was revealed that the season would include the Secret Warriors team by introducing Inhuman characters inspired by the comic of the same name. The episode "Emancipation" is set in the aftermath of Civil War, and deals with how the Secret Warriors and other Inhumans are affected by the Sokovia Accords, with some members of the S.H.I.E.L.D. team feeling "Inhumans should be registered and [others] who feel that's a first step to them being sequestered, imprisoned, exterminated." Wen noted that "The connection is there, but it’s also very tenuous at this point, because S.H.I.E.L.D. has become so isolated with what’s going on with the Avengers and them not knowing still that Coulson is alive." On how the themes of Civil War allowed the series to make more of a philosophical tie-in than with previous films, Whedon stated that "we do have people across the globe who have powers on our show and there would be varying reactions to that. A lot of fear, some excitement, some people wanting to use it for good, some people wanting to use it for evil. So, a lot of those same themes [from the film] will be addressed on our show." Bennet added, "we've been dealing with the bigger issues of Civil War on a smaller, more personal scale for a while now. It's been building. We've been having our own mini version of Civil War."

Additionally, the episode "Many Heads, One Tale" sees the season tie its Hydra and Inhuman storylines together, retconning the history of Hydra in the MCU, while the episode "Watchdogs" connects the series to several other MCU television shows: by featuring the chemical compound nitramene, which was developed by Howard Stark and seen in the Agent Carter episodes "Now is Not the End" and "Bridge and Tunnel"; by noting a gang war in Hell's Kitchen, as seen in the second season of Daredevil; and by referencing the company Damage Control, which was the focus of a potential MCU television series of the same name and later seen in Spider-Man: Homecoming. Despite similarities between the final conversation between Daisy and Lincoln in "Ascension" and that of Steve Rogers and Carter in Captain America: The First Avenger, the executive producers did not mirror that scene intentionally, with Whedon stating "There’s something heartbreaking about not being able to be face-to-face with the person". "Ascension" also introduces the concept of Life Model Decoys.

Marketing

To promote the inclusion of the Secret Warriors in the season, at San Diego Comic-Con International 2015, Marvel gave fans a chance to be a part of the team, with ambassadors roaming the convention to find the most dedicated fans and rewarding them with limited edition "Secret Warriors" pins. Fans with pins were then asked to post a photo of themselves wearing the pin to social media, for cast members of the series to select their favorites. A premiere was held for the season on September 23, 2015, at Pacific Theatres at The Grove in Los Angeles, where the first episode was shown. In early October, Marvel released a comedy video starring Dalton and Marvel Entertainment Chief Creative Officer Joe Quesada discussing a potential rebranding for Hydra, which was conceived and written by Dalton. On October 9, 2015, "A Wanted (Inhu)man" was screened at New York Comic Con, and on March 26, 2016, "Watchdogs" was screened at WonderCon.

Also at WonderCon, a poster based on the season was made available, with art by Mike McKone. It features Daisy, her pose an homage to a well-known Secret Warriors cover depicting the comic version of the character, with other main characters paired behind her (Coulson and Price, the latter because "she really was a big part of the first half of the season and...her death is the thing [that] drives Coulson", according to Bell; Fitz and Simmons; Hunter and Morse; May and Garner / Lash; and Mack and Elena Rodriguez). Lincoln is featured on his own, so as not to "take a super strong female character [Daisy] and reduce her to being a part of a relationship where she won't be fulfilled until she finds her man", as are Ward / Hive and Malick, the latter with the symbol of the former upon him: "We have told you who Ward's become, and Hive is the person that Malick is really in a relationship with. So the fact that reflection is on him or in him or around him is pretty potent," explained Bell. 

Beginning with "The Singularity", the final episodes of the season were marketed as Agents of S.H.I.E.L.D.: Fallen Agent, a "four-episode event". Marvel released clues as to who the Fallen Agent was online in the form of "sneak peek clips, artwork and more", leading up to the final reveal in the season finale. Marvel also released a poster for the event that recreated the cover of the "iconic" The Amazing Spider-Man #121 that served as the first issue of the story arc "The Night Gwen Stacy Died". The poster, created by Greg Land, also appeared as a "rare 1:1000" variant cover for Civil War II #0. Ahead of the final two episodes of the season, Marvel released a series of videos that "memorialized" each of the potential characters who could have been the Fallen Agent, with the Fallen Agent ultimately being Lincoln Campbell.

Release

Broadcast
The season began airing in the United States on ABC on September 29, 2015, and ran for 22 episodes. In Australia, the season aired on Fox8, rather than Seven Network with previous seasons, with a two-week delay from the U.S. airings. In the United Kingdom, the season moved to E4 after previously airing on Channel 4, and debuted on January 10, 2016.

Home media
The season began streaming on Netflix in the United States on June 16, 2016, and was available until February 28, 2022. It was released on Blu-ray and DVD in Region 4 on March 1, 2017. It became available on Disney+ in the United States on March 16, 2022, joining other territories where it was already available on the service.

Reception

Ratings

The season averaged 5.52 million total viewers, including from DVR, ranking 85th among network series in the 2015–16 television season. It also had an average total 18-49 rating of 2.0, which was 47th.

Critical response
The review aggregator website Rotten Tomatoes reports a 100% approval rating with an average score of 8.19/10, based on 22 reviews. The website's consensus reads, "Still evolving in its third season, Marvel's Agents of S.H.I.E.L.D. further hits its stride with a blend of thrills, humor, and heart."

Based on the premiere, Merrill Barr of Forbes felt that the show "has grown up a lot since its first year, and with the start of season three, it's hard to imagine what complaints any fans could possibly still have. If you want overall continuity, you got it. If you want people with super powers going crazy, it's there. If you want an ensemble cast that brings the broadcast television corner of the MCU to life, then look no further. The point is, with the new season of S.H.I.E.L.D., it's everything one could ask from the show." Vulture's Scott Meslow stated that the premiere was "riddled with [many] visual signifiers, highlighting the ways Agents of S.H.I.E.L.D. has gradually become sharper, sleeker, and more reliant on the bones of its comic-book source material."

Kevin Fitzpatrick at Screen Crush said that "Laws of Nature" "feels [like] the show's most confident, ambitious swing yet, its action-packed opening minutes a clear mission statement with an even more specific focus than Season 2." Brian Lowry, reviewing the episode for Variety, said, "Television obviously can't compete with the budgets and action found in summer blockbusters...but it has an advantage in being able to explore characters. Agents of S.H.I.E.L.D. obviously possesses a core audience drawn to those attributes, and showrunners Jed Whedon and Maurissa Tancharoen have admirably kept the plot moving ahead—engaging in larger serialized narratives—while grappling with the logistics of those ancillary considerations, which include plans for an Inhumans movie".

Eric Goldman of IGN scored the season a 7.9 out of 10, feeling it "had its up and downs, mixing in elements that worked (Daisy getting her Quake on, the Fitz and Simmons drama), elements we could have used more of (Secret Warriors!) and elements that just never felt right (Lincoln and his relationship with Daisy)." Goldman also felt that the first half of the season was "the stronger, more cohesive of the two halves" as it aired the episode "4,722 Hours" which Goldman called "the best hour of Agents of S.H.I.E.L.D. to date." He criticized the pacing of the season, saying "some episodes felt a bit jumbled and could have benefited from slowing down a bit—or simply not trying to do so much at once. Sometimes it was just a question of including too many characters or storylines in single episodes, causing some scenarios to not have time to breathe or get the proper build up they might have with more character-focused episodes."

Analysis
The season's connection to Captain America: Civil War of paralleling that film's themes and events was noted by critics.

Alex McCown, writing for The A.V. Club, called the season's use of the Watchdogs as "the most topical and relevant to our real-world situation Marvel's Agents of S.H.I.E.L.D. has ever gotten", comparing the group to Cliven Bundy and supporters of Donald Trump's 2016 presidential campaign, and feeling that "It's heartening to see the series laying this much groundwork in anticipation of mirroring the events of Civil War. We've all talked about how the films affect the shows, but not vice versa. This narrative means S.H.I.E.L.D. is taking full advantage of its medium in order to tell the story the upcoming Captain America film can't: A full and fraught exploration of the need to protect freedom and privacy, even for those with extraordinary abilities."

Fitzpatrick further discussed the "downright eerie parallel to current events" the Watchdogs brought to the series, saying that "if you stare at the news long enough it starts to mirror fiction, and boy if Agents of S.H.I.E.L.D. didn't terrifyingly benefit from that [in "Watchdogs"]....Sometimes, anyone in need of someone to blame for their troubles can fall in with radicals." Fitzpatrick noted other MCU tie-ins in the same episode "never felt particularly labored, but rather lived-in with a world that stretches back to Agent Carter-era Stark tech, drops the odd Daredevil Easter Egg, and helps contextualize a world where heroes create country-dropping robots....A topical bent like tonight's "Watchdogs" made for a great angle to build up that world mentality without feeling particularly subservient to the movies."

Accolades
The Atlantic named "4,722 Hours" one of the best television episodes of 2015.

|-
! scope="row" rowspan="6" | 2016
| rowspan="3" | Kids' Choice Awards
| Favorite Family TV Show
| Agents of S.H.I.E.L.D.
| 
| 
|-
| rowspan="2" | Favorite Female TV Star – Family Show
| Chloe Bennet
| 
| 
|-
| Ming-Na Wen
| 
| 
|-
| Saturn Awards
| Best Superhero Adaptation Series
| Agents of S.H.I.E.L.D.
| 
| style="text-align:center;" | 
|-
| Teen Choice Awards
| Choice TV Villain
| Brett Dalton
| 
| style="text-align:center;" | 
|-
| California on Location Awards 
| Location Manager of the Year – One Hour Television
| Justin Hill
| 
| style="text-align:center;" | 
|}

Notes

References

General references

External links
 

 
2015 American television seasons
2016 American television seasons
Fiction about mind control